Clara Levin Ant (born 7 February 1948) is a Bolivian architect and political activist in Brazil.

She started her political activity in the Trotskyist movement Liberdade e Luta but later moved to the centre left. Ant has been an activist of the Brazilian Partido dos Trabalhadores since its onset and was the party's treasurer before been elected a parliamentarian in 1986.
Later she became involved in the Executive branch of government as a regional administrator in the city of São Paulo under Marta Suplicy. She served as the Personal Assistant to Brazilian President Luiz Inácio Lula da Silva.  She played a role communicating between Lula / PT and the Brazilian Jewish community.

References

External links
 "VEJA COMO FOI A 39ª CONVENÇÃO ANUAL DA CONIB" Palestra de Clara Ant

People from La Paz
Bolivian Jews
Bolivian emigrants to Brazil
Brazilian Jews
Brazilian architects
Brazilian women architects
Brazilian Trotskyists
1948 births
Living people